Joe Ghanem (born May 8, 1990 in Falougha, Lebanon) is a Lebanese racing driver and son of 1980's Lebanese Rally Champion Samir Ghanem.

Ghanem became the first Lebanese to stand on a podium in a single seater race in Europe when he finished 2nd place in the 2009 Cooper Tires British Formula 3 International Series - National Class with Carlin Motorsport. He also is the first Lebanese to win a GT championship when he won the 2010-2011 UAE GT Championship (GTC).

Ghanem is also a rally driver with several podium finishes in local and regional rallies.

Career

Karting
Ghanem began his career in Karting. In 2004 he won the Lebanese Junior Championship Formula A.

Formula Racing
Ghanem started his [Formula Racing] career in 2006, finishing 3rd overall in the [Bahrain] based Thunder Arabia Middle Eastern Series with one pole position and six podiums. In 2007 and as part of the A1 Team Lebanon Driver Development Program,  he competed in eight races in the Eurocup Formula Renault 2.0 and in the Formula Renault 2.0 UK - Winter Series both with Carlin Motorsport. In 2008 and due to lack of funding he did not compete in Europe and returned in 2009 again with Carlin Motorsport, this time contesting the last two rounds of the British Formula Three – National Class, and finishing on the podium in 3 of the 4 races.

In 2011 Ghanem competed in the [UAE] based Formula Gulf 1000 with 8 wins, 5 pole positions, 12 podiums and 2 fastest laps.
In 2012 and 2013 he competed in the Formula Renault 2.0 BARC Championship with Mtech Lite; his best result came in Croft when he finished in 3rd position.

GT Racing
In 2010 Ghanem moved to the Middle East racing scene where he competed in the UAE GT Championship – GTC Class with Gulf Sport Racing driving a Ginetta G50 and winning the Championship with 1 win, 1 pole position and 5 podiums. 
In 2011 continued his championship winning streak by winning the Trofeo Maserati – Middle East with 6 wins, 7 pole positions and 8 podiums. He also contested 1st round of the Trofeo Maserati – European Series scoring a pole position, 1 fastest lap and finishing on the podium in all 3 the races.

Rallying and Hill Climb
In 2008 Ghanem took part in the 9th International Hill Climb Event that took place in Syria and won his Group category (Group N). 
In 2010 he finished 3rd overall in the 19th Rally of Cedars in Lebanon, 5th overall in the second National Rally in Jordan and 3rd overall in the first National Rally in Jordan.

Racing Career Summary

References

External links
 website
 
 
 
 
 

1990 births
Living people
Carlin racing drivers
Formula Renault Eurocup drivers
Formula Renault BARC drivers
British Formula Three Championship drivers
British Formula Renault 2.0 drivers
Lebanese racing drivers